Ramean tree may refer to:
 Arbor porphyriana
 Any binary tree